Cœur en sabot (French for "clog-shaped heart") is a radiological sign seen most commonly in patients with tetralogy of Fallot, a cyanotic congenital heart disease. It is a radiological term to describe the following findings in the x-ray:
 The cardiac size is normal or mildly enlarged.
 The left cardiac border shows uplifted apex "outermost lower most point of the heart at the left side" denoting right ventricular enlargement.
 exaggerated cardiac waist, which means that the pulmonary segment is small and concave suggesting infundibular pulmonary stenosis.

Echocardiography has been used for confirmation and differentiation of congenital heart diseases.

References

External links 

Heart diseases
Radiologic signs